Dioulacolon Arrondissement  is an arrondissement of the Kolda Department in the Kolda Region of Senegal.

Subdivisions
The arrondissement is divided administratively into rural communities and in turn into villages.

Arrondissements of Senegal
Kolda Region